This is a list of wars involving Namibia.

References

Namibia
Wars involving Namibia
Wars